Chongli District is a district of Zhangjiakou, Hebei province, China.

2022 Winter Olympics
Chongli District had been the stage of most of the skiing events during the 2022 Winter Olympics. The ski resort has earned over 1.54 billion yuan (237.77 million U.S. dollars) in tourism from the 2015-2016 snow season for a 31.6 percent growth over the previous season. In 2016 it was announced that Chongli has received 2.185 million tourists for an increase of 30 percent during the first snow season after the winning the Olympic bid. The snow season lasted for five months from November, during which Chongli has hosted 36 competitions and activities, such as Far East Cup and Children Skiing International Festival. A total of 23 skiing camps have also been set up, attracting the participation of 3,800 youths. All venue construction will start in November 2016 and will be finished by the end of 2022 to enable the city to hold test events.

Transport
Chongli railway station
Taizicheng railway station

Administrative Divisions
Towns:
Xiwanzi, Gaojiaying

Townships:
Sitaizui Township, Hongqiying Township, Shiyaozi Township, Yimatu Township, Shizuizi Township, Shizigou Township, Qingsanying Township, Baiqi Township

Climate

References

External links

County-level divisions of Hebei
Zhangjiakou